Rozsochatec is a municipality and village in Havlíčkův Brod District in the Vysočina Region of the Czech Republic. It has about 500 inhabitants.

Administrative parts
The village of Jahodov is an administrative part of Rozsochatec.

History
The first written mention of Rozsochatec is from 1283.

Gallery

References

Villages in Havlíčkův Brod District